This is a list of the highest points (mountains, hills, glaciers) of all Norwegian counties.

Ranked by elevation.

Highest points by former counties 
(before 2016)
Ranked by elevation.

See also 
 List of mountains in Norway by height
 List of mountains in Norway by prominence

References
 Toppomania fylkestopper (in Norwegian)
 http://www.statkart.no/IPS/?module=Files;action=File.getFile;ID=19345

 
Counties, highest
Norwegian counties
 
Highest points
Lists of mountains by elevation